Frank Delos Wolfe (1863–1926) was an architect for clients across northern California. He contributed significantly to the architecture in now-historic neighborhoods of San Jose, California.

Frank Wolfe was born in Green Springs, Ohio. In 1888 he moved to San Jose, California. In 1892 he began work as an architect.

Frank partnered with Charles McKenzie from 1899 to 1910. Together they designed hundreds of buildings. Wolfe and McKenzie worked on houses in Naglee Park beginning in 1902 and then Hanchett Park beginning in 1906. Frank's son Carl joined him as an associate in 1912. Under the Wolfe & Wolfe partnership Frank designed several California Prairie style homes. Frank designed houses of Palm Haven in Willow Glen.

References

1863 births
1926 deaths
Architects from Ohio
Architects from California
People from Green Springs, Ohio
People from San Jose, California